Mariana Gómez (born 11 July 1990) is a team handball player from Uruguay. As of 2011 she played on the Uruguay women's national handball team, and she participated at the 2011 World Women's Handball Championship in Brazil.

References

1990 births
Living people
Uruguayan female handball players
21st-century Uruguayan women